Rein Kask (born 12 February 1947 in Pärnu) is an Estonian politician. He was a member of VIII Riigikogu.

References

Living people
1947 births
Members of the Riigikogu, 1995–1999
Politicians from Pärnu